The 2000 Petit Le Mans presented by Audi was the third running of the Petit Le Mans and the ninth round of the 2000 American Le Mans Series season.  It took place at Road Atlanta, Georgia, on September 30, 2000.

Official results
Class winners in bold.

Statistics
 Pole Position - #77 Audi Sport North America - 1:10.379
 Fastest Lap - #77 Audi Sport North America - 1:11.782
 Distance - 1610.567 km
 Average Speed - 176.122 km/h

External links
  
 World Sports Racing Prototypes - Race Results

P
Petit Le Mans
Petit Le Mans